Jack Francis Avina (January 30, 1929 – October 4, 2018) was an American college basketball coach, known for his career at head coach at the NCAA Division I University of Portland where he served for 17 seasons.

Avina, a Mexican-American born in Madera, California, served in the United States Navy, then attended San Jose State University where he played basketball for two seasons. He first coached at the high school level in California, at Gridley High School and San Jose High School. He then moved to San Mateo Junior College (now the College of San Mateo) for eight seasons from 1962 to 1970, compiling a record of 140–80. He then moved to the major college ranks to Portland. Avina coached the Pilots from 1970 to 1987, compiling a record of 222–243. He coached several of the school's top players, including National Basketball Association (NBA) players Jose Slaughter and Darwin Cook. Avina retired in 1987 after a 14–14 campaign.

Following his time at Portland, he coached professionally in Brazil and Turkey.

Avina died on October 4, 2018, in Lafayette, California, at the age of 89.

References

External links
Coaching record @ sports-reference.com

1929 births
2018 deaths
American expatriate basketball people in Brazil
American expatriate basketball people in Turkey
American men's basketball coaches
American sportspeople of Mexican descent
Basketball coaches from California
Basketball players from California
College men's basketball head coaches in the United States
High school basketball coaches in California
Junior college men's basketball coaches in the United States
People from Madera County, California
Portland Pilots men's basketball coaches
San Jose State Spartans men's basketball players
American men's basketball players
Galatasaray S.K. (men's basketball) coaches
United States Navy sailors